Kimmel can refer to:

People
 Bobby Kimmel (born 1940), musician and recording artist
 Bruce Kimmel (born 1947), music producer (Kritzerland Records)
 Daniel M. Kimmel (born 1955), film critic
 Dick Kimmel (born 1947), bluegrass musician and biologist 
 Doc Kimmel (1926-2022), American physician and politician
 Eric Kimmel (born 1946), author
 Frank Kimmel (born 1962), race car driver
 Haven Kimmel (born 1965), American writer
 Husband E. Kimmel (1882–1968), admiral
 J. D. Kimmel (1929–2008), American football player
 Jimmy Kimmel (born 1967), American actor, comedian, and talk show host
 John C. Kimmel (born 1954), American racehorse trainer
 Jon Kimmel (born 1960), American football player
 Jonathan Kimmel (born 1976), American writer
 Manning M. Kimmel (1832–1916), American Civil War officer
 Manning Kimmel (1913–1944), U.S. naval officer
 Manny Kimmel, underworld figure
 Martin Kimmel (1916–2008), real estate developer
 Michael Kimmel (born 1951), sociologist
 Richard Kimmel, theatre director
 Robert Kimmel, packaging engineer
 Robert Kimmel Smith (born 1930), children's author
 Ron Kimmel (born 1963), Israeli computer scientist
 Sidney Kimmel (born 1928), film producer and clothing manufacturer
 Tom Kimmel (born 1953), singer
 Tõnis Kimmel (born 1977), architect
 William Kimmel (1812–1886), politician

Places
 Kimmel Township, Pennsylvania
 Kimmel Center for the Performing Arts, Philadelphia, PA
 Kimmel, Algeria

Other
 Kimmel bread, rye bread with caraway seeds
 Kimmel Eshkolot Architects, Israeli architecture firm
 Kümmel (liqueur) or kimmel, a sweet, colorless liqueur
 USS Charles J. Kimmel (DE-584), U.S. Navy destroyer escort

Kimmell
Dana Kimmell, American actress

German-language surnames